Allen Rock may refer to:

See also
Allan Rock a Canadian politician